Emim may refer to:
Emite, one of the tribes of Rephaim
1-Ethyl-3-methylimidazolium chloride